Harry Hutton (30 December 1907 – 23 December 1981) was a Scotland international rugby union player.

Rugby Union career

Amateur career

He played for Dunfermline. He was injured for the most part of the 1933–34 season but he was made captain of the club for the 1934–35 season.

Provincial career

He played for Midlands District in their match against North of Scotland District on 8 November 1930.

The Aberdeen Press and Journal of 10 November 1930 reported:
A. H. M Hutton at fullback not only made no mistakes, but in kicking five consecutive goals showed how valuable he would be in any side.

Hutton was then picked for the composite North of Scotland District side to play against the South of Scotland District on 22 November 1930. The match was played in miserable rain and wind, and resulted in a draw. He played in the same fixture for North on 18 November 1933.

International career

He was capped just the once for Scotland in 1932. Injury was said to have robbed him of future caps.

Cricket career

He was a wicket-keeper for Fifeshire. In 1933 he had to get an operation on his hand which stopped him playing both cricket and rugby, though he returned to both sports.

Family

His father was a county councillor for Carnock and Saline, and a Secretary of Oakley United.

Harry Hutton married Winifred Macdonald in 1939. Macdonald was a gymnastics teacher in Dundee.

References

1907 births
1981 deaths
Scottish rugby union players
Scotland international rugby union players
Rugby union fullbacks
Dunfermline RFC players
Midlands District players
North of Scotland (combined side) players